Oak Mountain is a mountain in the northern Peninsular Ranges System, in Riverside County, in southern California.

The two peaks of the mountain are divided by the gorge of Temecula Creek Canyon which has Vail Lake Dam at its head. The Vail Lake reservoir is to the east of its southern peak and southeast of its northern peak and at the base of the mountain. The Black Hills lie to the north of the mountain and Agua Tibia Mountain lies to its south.

References 

Peninsular Ranges
Mountains of Riverside County, California
Mountains of Southern California